Frankie Ortega (November 27, 1927 – February 7, 1994) was an American jazz piano player and bandleader with the Frankie Ortega Trio during the 1950s and 1960s.

Biography
He was born on November 27, 1927, in Alhambra, California, United States. Ortega released Swingin' Abroad on Jubilee Records in 1958 and he composed the theme music for the TV series King of Diamonds in 1961. He may be best remembered for the trio's frequent appearances as the house band at Dino's Lodge on 77 Sunset Strip.  He died on February 7, 1994, in Anaheim, California.

Discography
 Twilight Time (1957)
 Twinkling Pinkies (1958)
 Swingin' Abroad (1958)
 At the Ember's (1958)
 Keyboard Caravan (Imperial, 1959)
 77 Sunset Strip (1959)
 The Piano Styling of Frankie Ortega (Imperial, 1959)
 The Frankie Ortega Trio at Dino's (Warner Bros., 1959)
 Smokin' (Dobre, 1978)

Frankie Ortega Trio
Frankie Ortega
Carl Frederick Tandberg (1910–1988), bass

References

External links

1927 births
1994 deaths
American male pianists
American jazz pianists
Jubilee Records artists
20th-century American male musicians